Coquelicot Asleep in the Poppies: A Variety of Whimsical Verse is the fourth full-length album by psychedelic pop band of Montreal, released in 2001 by Kindercore Records. The record is more of a full band recording than previous of Montreal albums.

The majority of the songs on the album tell bizarre stories about invented characters. "The Events Leading Up to the Collapse of Detective Dulllight" is a spoken word track. As a whole, the album is a loose concept album inspired by the Beach Boys' Smile, Frank Zappa's We're Only in It for the Money, and Os Mutantes.

Background
In an interview to the American zine ZUM, frontman Kevin Barnes said: "Coquelicot is an Efeblum. An Efeblum is a fairy-like creature who is employed by the Efeneties (loving spirits) to place bells inside people's hearts. When a person has a bell in their heart they are able to create works of art, fall in love and feel at peace with the world. Coquelicot, during one of her trips to Earth, decides to discard her bells and experience life as a human. Instead of living in "reality" she decides to experience life in a sleeping unconscious/conscious state. It is in this subconscious world that she meets Claude and Lecithin the inventor. They do all sorts of crazy stuff together like having incredible battles with evergreens and satellites, getting chased by psychotic zombies, playing with Lecithin's inventions and eventually moving away together to a deserted frozen island. In time, Coquelicot feels remorseful about neglecting her responsibilities as an Efeblum and decides to return to her work. She can't bear the thought of leaving her two new best friends so she invites them to come along with her. They happily [accept] and join her as honorary Efeblums."

Track listing

Personnel
Kevin Barnes
Dottie Alexander
Derek Almstead
Jamey Huggins
Andy Gonzales

See also
 SUMonline Interviews (2000); of Montreal, by Jeremy Crown

References

Of Montreal albums
2001 albums
Kindercore Records albums
Concept albums